Pyrausta euchromistes is a moth in the family Crambidae. It is found in Mexico.

References

Moths described in 1918
euchromistes
Moths of Central America